Ivan "Mighty" Robinson (born February 27, 1971 in Philadelphia) is a boxer who has compiled a record of 36-12-2 (12 KOs) since becoming a professional in 1992. He challenged once for the IBF lightweight title in 1996.

Background 
Born and raised in Philadelphia, Robinson began boxing from an early age. He attended Simon Gratz High School.

Amateur career 
Robinson had a stellar amateur career and was a national amateur champion. Some of his highlights are below:

Featherweight Silver Medalist at 1990 Goodwill Games in Seattle, United States. Results were:
Kirkor Kirkorov (Bulgaria) won on points
Faat Gatin (Soviet Union) won by TKO 3
Oscar De La Hoya (United States) lost on points
1991 United States Amateur Featherweight Champion
1991 World Championships in Sydney, Australia, competed as a Featherweight. Results were:
Jose Fernandes (Portugal) won on points
Duk-Kyu Park (South Korea) lost on points
Attempted to qualify for the Olympics as a Featherweight at the 1992 Olympic Trials in competition at Worcester, MA. Results were:
Kenneth Friday won on points
Michael Clark won on points
Julian Wheeler lost on points, in final
Julian Wheeler lost on points, at Box-Offs in Phoenix, AZ

Professional career 
Robinson had been a lightweight and Junior Welterweight contender. He has been in several notable bouts, particularly his first victory over Arturo Gatti, a fight that was voted Fight of the Year by Ring magazine. Other notable bouts include his second bout with Gatti, (which he also won), and his 12 round whirlwind bout with then lightweight champion Phillip Holiday. Robinson fought on May 28, 2005, when he lost a 10-round unanimous decision to Julio César Chávez at Staples Center in Los Angeles.

He won the USBA and NABF lightweight titles over his career. Fans consider Robinson a great sportsman, who fought Mexican legend Julio César Chávez and fought wars with Arturo Gatti.

In 2013, Ivan Robinson was inducted into the Pennsylvania Boxing Hall of Fame. He was one of 10 inductees in the 10-member class of 2013.

Professional boxing record

References

External links 
 

!colspan="3" style="background:#C1D8FF;"| Regional titles
|-

1971 births
Living people
Boxers from Philadelphia
American male boxers
Lightweight boxers
Competitors at the 1990 Goodwill Games